Vienna Cricket and Football-Club is a sports club based on Döbling district, Vienna. Established on 23 August 1894, it is the second oldest team after their rivals First Vienna FC 1894. It is familiarly known to Austrians by the English name Cricketer. In the early 20th century the club was popular for cricket and football, but now athletics and tennis.

Stadium
The stadium of the Vienna Cricket and Football Club is the Cricketer-Platz on Vorgartenstraße, which was built in 1904 on today's Meiereistraße.  In 1908 the first international football match between Austria and Germany took place there.

Honours
Challenge Cup: 1897–98, 1901–02

References

Sport in Vienna
Sports clubs established in 1894
1894 establishments in Austria
Football clubs in Vienna